Florence Crowley (27 December 1934 – 16 May 1997) was an Irish Fianna Fáil politician. He was a Teachta Dála (TD) for thirteen years, and a Senator for five years.

Family
An auctioneer from Bandon, County Cork, Crowley was an accomplished rugby player in his youth. He and his wife Sally had six children. Their son Brian Crowley is a former Fianna Fáil senator and MEP.

Political career
He stood unsuccessfully as a Fianna Fáil candidate for Dáil Éireann in the Cork Mid constituency at a by-election in March 1965, but won the seat at the 1965 general election in April. After boundary changes for the 1969 general election, he was re-elected in the new Cork South-West constituency, and held the seat at the 1973 general election. Meanwhile, he had been elected in 1967 as a member of both Cork City Council and Cork County Council, and after the 1971 local elections had remained a member only of the County Council.

He lost his seat at the 1977 general election. Fianna Fáil won a landslide victory, but it had fielded three candidates in Cork South-West and won only one seat. Crowley, the sitting TD, was beaten by his party colleague Joe Walsh. He was then elected to the 14th Seanad Éireann on the Cultural and Educational Panel, and at the 1981 general he regained his Dáil seat from Walsh. Walsh retook the seat at the February 1982 general election, following which Crowley stood in the Seanad elections on the Cultural and Educational Panel. However, he did not win a seat; at the time Fianna Fáil was deeply divided between supporters and opponents of its leader Charles Haughey, and the Haughey-supporting Crowley was beaten by another Fianna Fáil candidate, Séamus de Brún, who had previously been nominated by the Taoiseach, Jack Lynch to the 14th Seanad. Crowley was then nominated by Haughey to the 16th Seanad.

Crowley did not contest the November 1982 general election. In the subsequent February 1983 Seanad election, he stood as a candidate on the Administrative Panel, but did not win a seat.

Death
Crowley died suddenly at his home in Bandon on 16 May 1997, aged 62.

See also
Families in the Oireachtas

References

1934 births
1997 deaths
Fianna Fáil TDs
Members of the 18th Dáil
Members of the 19th Dáil
Members of the 20th Dáil
Members of the 14th Seanad
Members of the 22nd Dáil
Members of the 16th Seanad
Local councillors in County Cork
Nominated members of Seanad Éireann
Fianna Fáil senators